Bill Dillon (1 June 1905 – 23 May 1979) was an Irish sportsperson.  He played Gaelic football with his local club Dingle and was a member of the Kerry senior inter-county team from 1937 until 1941.  Dillon captained Kerry to a third consecutive All-Ireland title in 1941.

References

External links
 

 

1905 births
1979 deaths
Dingle Gaelic footballers
Kerry inter-county Gaelic footballers
Munster inter-provincial Gaelic footballers